Pristigasteridae is a family of ray-finned fish related to the herrings, including the genera Ilisha, Pellona, and Pristigaster. One common name for the taxon is longfin herring. The taxonomic classification of this family is in doubt; it was traditionally divided into two subfamilies, Pelloninae and Pristigasterinae, but molecular data indicates that these are not monophyletic.

References

External links
 

 
Fish of the Atlantic Ocean
Fish of the Pacific Ocean
Fish of the Indian Ocean
Ray-finned fish families
Marine fish families